Bring Your Board!! is the second full album by the Japanese music group Ellegarden. It was released on July 2, 2003.

Track listing
Surfrider Association - 2:43
No. 13 - 3:35
Jitterbug (ジターバグ) - 3:20
A Song for James - 3:28
Wannabies - 3:17
Insane - 3:38
My Friend Is Falling Down - 3:20
Dancing in a Circle - 3:17
Cuomo - 1:49
Kinsei (金星, Venus) - 3:17
So Sad - 2:45

Charts

References

Ellegarden albums
2003 albums